Senador Vasconcelos is a neighborhood in the West Zone of Rio de Janeiro, Brazil.

Neighborhood statistics 
Total area (2003): 644.18 hectares.
Total population (2010): 30,600
Total of domiciles (2010): 9,826
Administrative region: XVIII - Campo Grande.

References

Neighbourhoods in Rio de Janeiro (city)